Oak Street School may refer to:
 Oak Street School (Lewiston, Maine), listed on U.S. NRHP
 Oak Street School (Fulton, New York), NRHP